The 2013 Virginia Cavaliers football team represented the University of Virginia in the 2013 NCAA Division I FBS football season. The Cavaliers were led by fourth year head coach Mike London and played their home games at Scott Stadium. They were members of the Coastal Division of the Atlantic Coast Conference. They finished the season 2–10, 0–8 in ACC play to finish in last place in the Coastal Division.

Previous season
The Cavaliers went 4–8 in 2012, disappointing expectations under head coach Mike London's third season. The Cavaliers followed a 2–0 start with a 2–8 finish that saw the team lose six straight before shocking NC State on the road and the Miami Hurricanes at home before closing the season, and their bowl hopes, with losses to rivals UNC and VT.  The offseason saw a period of coaching upheaval and reassignment that was headlined by the arrivals of Jon Tenuta, Steve Fairchild, and the return of Tom O'Brien, among others. Bill Lazor departed back to the NFL

Coaching staff

Schedule

Players
1 Demetrious Nicholson
2 Dominique Terrell
3 Billy Skrobacz
4 Taquan Mizzell
5 QB David Watford, Jr.
5 Tim Harris
6 Darius Jennings
7 Eli Harold DE
8 Anthony Harris
9 Pablo Alvarez
10 C.J. Moore
11 QB Greyson Lambert, Fr.
13 Daquan Romero
14 Andre Levrone
14 Ian Frye
15 Matt Johns
16 Brendan Marshall
17 Miles Gooch
18 Andrew Mackay
18 Anthony Cooper
19 E.J. Scott
20 Tim Smith
21 Brandon Phelps
22 Daniel Hamm
22 DreQuan Hoskey
23 Khalek Shepherd
25 David Marrs
25 Kevin Parks
26 Maurice Canady
26 Anthony Calloway
27 Rijo Walker
28 Wilfred Wahee
28 Willem van Reesema
29 Adam Caplinger
29 D.J. Hill
30 Alec Vozenilek P 5-10 190 JR Richmond, Va./St. Christopher's School
30 LaChaston Smith
31 Kyrrel Latimer
31 Blake Blaze
32 Mike Moore
32 James Coleman
33 Kirk Garner
34 Kwontie Moore
36 R.C. Willenbrock
36 Kye Morgan
37 Divante Walker
38 Nicholas Conte
38 Kelvin Rainey
39 Malcolm Cook
40 Darius Lee
41 Connor Wingo-Reeves
42 Demeitre Brim
43 Trent Corney
44 Henry Coley
45 Matt Fortin
45 Israel Vaughan
46 Mason Thomas
47 Vincent Croce
49 Zachary Swanson
50 Marco Jones
50 Tyler Shirley
51 Zach Bradshaw
52 Sammy MacFarlane
52 Jon Goss
53 Micah Kiser
54 Alex Foertsch
55 David Dean
56 Andre Miles-Redmond
57 Stephen Lawe
59 Mark Hall
60 John Pond
60 Jeb Byrne
61 Cody Wallace
62 Sean Karl
63 Ryan Doull
64 Nick Koutris
65 Ross Burbank
66 George Adeosun
67 Jackson Matteo
68 Eric Tetlow
69 Phillip Berry
70 Luke Bowanko
71 Jack McDonald
72 Eric Smith
74 Conner Davis
75 Sadiq Olanrewaju
76 Michael Mooney
77 Jay Whitmire
78 Morgan Moses
79 Jack Babcock
79 Sean Cascarano
80 Adrian Gamble
81 Jamall Brown
82 Mario Nixon
83 Jake McGee
84 Canaan Severin
85 Keeon Johnson
86 Jeremy Dollin
87 Kyle Dockins
88 Ryan Santoro
88 Max Valles
89 Rob Burns
90 Jake Snyder
91 Jack English
91 Dylan Sims
92 Greg Gallop
93 Donte Wilkins
95 Tyrell Chavis
96 Cameron Fitch
99 Brent Urban

Depth chart
Depth Chart release before October 6, 2012 Duke game.

Game summaries

BYU

Sources:

References

Virginia
Virginia Cavaliers football seasons
Virginia Cavaliers football